= Tide, Maharashtra =

Village in Maharashtra

Tide
- Village
- Interactive map of Tide
- Country: India
- State: Maharashtra

Tide is a small village in Ratnagiri district, Maharashtra state in Western India. The 2011 Census of India recorded a total of 1,519 residents in the village. Tide's geographical area is 713 hectares (1,760 acres).
